Feels Like Spring is a collaborative studio album by Australian recording artists James Morrison and The Idea of North. The album was released in April 2010.

At the ARIA Music Awards of 2010, the album won the ARIA Award for Best Jazz Album.

Track listing
 "Dear John" (Andrew Piper) - 3:11
 "The Nearness of You" (Hoagy Carmichael, Ned Washington)- 3:50
 "It Might As Well Be Spring" (Oscar Hammerstein II, Richard Rodgers)- 3:43
 "Over the Rainbow" (Harold Arlen, Yip Harburg)- 5:53
 "Le Belleclaire Blues" (James Morrison) - 4:14
 "Bella Tina" (Andrew Piper) - 4:16
 "Smile" (Charlie Chaplin, Geoffrey Parsons, John Turner) - 4:28
 "If I Were a Bell" (Frank Loesser) - 3:20
 "Stella by Starlight" (Nick Begbie, Ned Washington, Victor Young)- 5:11
 "Since I Fell for You" (Buddy Johnson) - 5:20
 "Enchanted" (James Morrison) - 3:33
 "What a Fool Believes" (Kenny Loggins, Michael McDonald) - 3:46

Charts

Weekly charts

Year-end charts

References

2010 albums
Collaborative albums
ARIA Award-winning albums
The Idea of North albums
Jazz albums by Australian artists